Oligomeria conoidea is a species of extremely small deep water sea snail, a marine gastropod mollusk in the family Seguenziidae.

Description
The height of the shell attains 5 mm.

Distribution
This marine species occurs off the Kurile Islands, Russia

References

External links
 To Encyclopedia of Life
 To World Register of Marine Species

Oligomeria
Gastropods described in 1985